Solo garlic, also known as single clove garlic, monobulb garlic, single bulb garlic, or pearl garlic, is a type of Allium sativum (garlic). The size of the single clove differs from approximately 25 to 50 mm in diameter. It has the flavour of the garlic clove but is somewhat milder and slightly perfumed. The appearance is somewhat akin to that of a pickling onion, with white skin and often purple stripes. Solo garlic offers the advantage, compared to traditional garlic, of being very quick and easy to peel.

Single clove garlic has been grown at the foothills of the Himalayan Mountains for about 7,000 years. It is not a single variety of garlic, but rather a product of specific planting practices. As a result, single cloved versions of other garlic species such as Allium nigrum and Allium ampeloprasum are also available.

Growth
Small bulbs of solo garlic can be obtained by planting the bulbils of any variety of garlic. However, commercial production comes from areas where garlic is likely to produce a solo bulb due to environmental factors. The climate in these areas, combined with careful cultivation, leads to a large percentage of the garlic crop failing to split into multiple cloves.

Cultivation

China
Solo garlic is believed to have originated in Yunnan, China, a mountainous area. The product is known as  "only-child garlic".

India
In Hindi, it is known as ek kali ka lehsun or ek kali lahsun,, in the Malvi language, it is called ekal kuli (एकल कुली) and 'bitki lassan'. In বাংলা it is called ek koa rosun (এক কোয়া রসুন).
It is mostly found in the central part of India and the major producing States are Madhya Pradesh and some parts of Rajasthan but the biggest supplying districts were Neemuch and Mandsaur. They are grown after Diwali festival in Rabi Season in the month of November and December and harvested in February and March. In comparisons to Chinese Solo garlic, Indian Single clove garlics are smaller in size—around 1–2 cm—and more cylindrical in shape. Their skin is mostly white, with light purple lines appearing on some garlic bulbs.

Peru 
A variety of monobulb garlic is sometimes found in markets in central Peru. It is known locally as ajo trompo "top garlic" due to the shape, which resembles a toy top. The skin is pure white. The flavor is as described above, mild and slightly perfumed. The origin is unknown, but it likely was brought to South America by Chinese immigrants.

See also 
Black garlic (food)

References 

Spices
Garlic